The 2001 Firestone Firehawk 500 was a Championship Auto Racing Teams (CART) motor race held on May 19, 2001 at Twin Ring Motegi in Tochigi, Japan. It was the 5th round of the 2001 CART FedEx Championship Series season. Team Rahal driver Kenny Bräck scored his first career win in CART despite not starting on the front row for the first time that season. Polesitter Hélio Castroneves finished 2nd and Tony Kanaan took 3rd.

Bräck's win moved him five spots into 1st place in the drivers' standings, where he would remain for much of the season. It was Team Rahal's first win of the season and their first since 2000 at Miami-Homestead. Castroneves' podium put him at 2nd place overall in the standings; he and Bräck would continue to battle for 1st place for much of the season. Kanaan's podium was his first since his win at the 1999 U.S. 500 in Michigan and would be his and Mo Nunn Racing's only podium in 2001.

The race was a testament to Bräck and Castroneves' blistering race pace, as both were the only ones still on the lead lap at the end of the race; this was partially the result of the long, uninterrupted stretch of green-flag running between Laps 8 and 194. Throughout the race Brack was the last of the leaders to pit during each round of stops. He thus needed less fuel at his final pit stop and saved enough time to leap from third to first place. The race also saw heavy attrition, as almost half of the entrants ultimately retired with a variety of issues. Points leader Cristiano da Matta was taken out on Lap 1 by rookie Bruno Junqueira, who spun coming out of Turn 2. This dropped the points leader into a tie for 3rd in the standings.

Qualifying

Race

– Includes two bonus points for leading the most laps and being the fastest qualifier.

Race statistics
Lead changes: 9 among 5 drivers

Standings after the race

Drivers' standings 

Constructors' standings

Manufacturer's Standings

References

Firestone Firehawk 500, 2001